The 2010 FIFA World Cup qualification UEFA Group 6 was a UEFA qualifying group for the 2010 FIFA World Cup. The group comprised Croatia, England, Ukraine, Belarus, Kazakhstan and Andorra.

The group was won by England, who qualified for the 2010 FIFA World Cup. The runners-up Ukraine entered the UEFA play-off stage.

Standings

Matches
The fixture list was determined on 14 January 2008 in Zagreb, Croatia. The August 2009 date in the international match calendar was moved forward by one week, from 19 August to 12 August 2009, at the FIFA Executive Committee meeting on 27 May 2008.

Notes

Goalscorers
There were 107 goals scored during the 30 games, an average of 3.56 goals per game.

9 goals
 Wayne Rooney

6 goals
 Andriy Shevchenko

5 goals
 Timofei Kalachev
 Serhiy Nazarenko

4 goals
 Peter Crouch
 Frank Lampard

3 goals

 Eduardo
 Luka Modrić
 Ivica Olić
 Ivan Rakitić
 Jermain Defoe
 Steven Gerrard
 Theo Walcott
 Sergey Khizhnichenko
 Sergei Ostapenko

2 goals

 Gennadi Bliznyuk
 Sergei Kornilenko
 Vitali Rodionov
 Dmitry Verkhovtsov
 Mladen Petrić
 Joe Cole
 Artem Milevskyi
 Yevhen Seleznyov
 Andriy Yarmolenko

1 goal

 Ildefons Lima
 Marc Pujol
 Oscar Sonejee
 Maksim Bardachov
 Alexander Hleb
 Vyacheslav Hleb
 Leonid Kovel
 Pavel Sitko
 Ihar Stasevich
 Ivan Klasnić
 Niko Kovač
 Niko Kranjčar
 Mario Mandžukić
 Ognjen Vukojević
 Gareth Barry
 Rio Ferdinand
 Emile Heskey
 John Terry
 Shaun Wright-Phillips
 Rinat Abdulin
 Ruslan Baltiyev
 Zhambyl Kukeyev
 Tanat Nusserbayev
 Roman Uzdenov
 Oleksiy Gai
 Oleh Husyev
 Yaroslav Rakytskiy

1 own goal
 Ildefons Lima (playing against Ukraine)
 Aleksandr Kuchma (playing against England)

Attendances

References

6
2008–09 in English football
Qual
2008–09 in Croatian football
2009–10 in Croatian football
2008–09 in Ukrainian football
2009–10 in Ukrainian football
2008–09 in Andorran football
2009–10 in Andorran football
2009 in Belarusian football
2008 in Belarusian football
2009 in Kazakhstani football
2008 in Kazakhstani football